, also called Japanese school, is a full-day school outside Japan intended primarily for Japanese citizens living abroad. It is an expatriate school designed for children whose parents are working on diplomatic, business, or education missions overseas and have plans to repatriate to Japan.

The schools offer exactly the same curriculum used in public elementary and junior high schools in Japan, so when the students go back to Japan, they will not fall behind in the class. Some schools accept Japanese citizens only; others welcome Japanese speaking students regardless of citizenship.

They are accredited by Japan's Ministry of education and science and receive funding from the Japanese government. There were 85 schools worldwide as of April 2006, and all of these schools provide English classes in the primary education.

Every school hires teachers from Japan on a two- to three-year assignment, but they also hire people from the local community as Japanese-speaking teachers, English and other language instructors, administrative assistants, gardeners, janitors and security guards.

Nihonjin gakkō serve elementary school and junior high school. One nihonjin gakkō, Shanghai Japanese School, has a senior high school program.

Schools that partially offer the nihonjin gakkō's curriculum after school hours or on weekends are sometimes called Japanese schools, too, but strictly speaking they are categorized as hoshū jugyō kō or hoshūkō, a supplementary school.

History

Some of the nihonjin gakkō in Asia have a long history, originally established as public schools in the Japan-occupied territories in Thailand, Philippines, and Taiwan.

As Japan recovered after World War II, increased numbers of Japanese international schools serving elementary and junior high school levels opened around the world. The first postwar Japanese overseas school was the Japanese School of Bangkok, which opened in 1956.

The Ministry of Education of Japan, as of 1985, encouraged the development of nihonjin gakkō, in developing countries, while it encouraged the opening of hoshū jugyō kō, or part-time supplementary schools, in developed countries. However, some Japanese parents in developed countries, in addition to those in developing countries, campaigned for the opening of nihonjin gakkō in developed countries due to concern about the education of their children.

In 1971, there were 22 nihonjin gakkō worldwide. During the postwar rapid economic growth in the 1950s to early 1970s and the Japanese asset price bubble in the 1980s, the country gained economic power and many sogo shoshas and major industries sent their employees all over the world. That was when many nihonjin gakko were established to educate their children in Asia, Europe, Middle East, North, Central and South America. The number of nihonjin gakkō increased to 80 in 1986 with the opening of Japanese schools in Barcelona and Melbourne. As of May of that year 968 teachers from Japan were teaching at these Japanese schools worldwide. That month 15,811 students were enrolled in those schools. The number of nihonjin gakkō increased to 82 by 1987.

In the early 1980s, 40% of Japanese national children living in Europe attended nihonjin gakkō, while almost 95% of Japanese national children living abroad in Asia attended nihonjin gakkō.

Many Japanese parents abroad sent their children to Japan to attend high school after they completed the junior high school abroad, or leaving the children behind, so they could become accustomed to the difficult Japanese university entrance systems. Toshio Iwasaki, the editor of the Journal of Japanese Trade & Industry, stated that this reason inhibited the development of Japanese senior high schools in other countries. The first overseas international schools that served the senior high school level were the Rikkyo School in England, gaining senior high school level classes after 1975, and the Lycée Seijo in France, which opened in 1986. By 1991 Japanese international senior high schools were in operation in the United States, France, the United Kingdom, Singapore, Germany, Denmark, and Ireland.

By 1991 many overseas Japanese high schools were accepting students who were resident in Japan, and some wealthier families in Japan chose to send their children to Japanese schools abroad instead of Japanese schools in Japan.

While Japan was experiencing a major recession called the Lost Decade in the 1990s, so were nihonjin gakkō. Many of them were closed due to a dramatic decrease in enrollment.

With its rapidly growing economy, China is an exception. Schools in Beijing, Shanghai and  have been expanding and new schools had founded in Dalian, Guangzhou, Tianjin, Qingdao, Suzhou since 1991.

By 2004 there were 83 Japanese day schools in 50 countries.

Characteristics

Nihonjin gakkō use Japanese as their language of instruction. The curriculum is approved by the Japanese Ministry of Education, Culture, Sports, Science and Technology (MEXT) so that students may easily adjust upon returning to Japan. For foreign language classes, each school usually teaches English and, if different, a major local language of the country. Most nihonjin gakkō do not admit people lacking Japanese citizenship. This practice differs from those of American and British international schools, which do admit students of other nationalities. Nihonjin gakkō usually use the Japanese academic calendar instead of those of their host countries.

Tendencies

As of 2005–2007, parents of Japanese nationality residing in the United States and Europe, as well as other industrialized and developed regions, generally prefer local schools over nihonjin gakkō, while Japanese parents in Asia and the Middle East prefer nihonjin gakkō.

In 2003 11,579 Japanese students living in Asia (outside Japan) attended full-time Japanese schools, making up more than 70% of the Japanese students in Asia. In Oceania, 194 Japanese pupils attended full-time Japanese schools, making up 7.7% of the total Japanese students in Oceania. In North America there were 502 students at full-time Japanese schools, making up 2.4% of Japanese pupils on that continent. As of 2007, there were a total of three nihonjin gakkō on the U.S. mainland recognized by MEXT.

Since the early 1990s, more parents have chosen a local school or an international school over nihonjin gakkō. Reasons include:
 The parents prefer for their children to receive education in English;
Nihonjin gakkō have only elementary and middle schools, grades first through ninth, which are mandatory in Japan. Some schools offer a kindergarten program as well as a high school program, but they are uncommon. Children educated in an English-speaking environment will be able to continue their education where they live with their parents. Those who choose not to participate in the local education system will need to pass an entrance exam to enroll in a boarding school in Japan or one of the seven (as of October 2006) Shiritsu zaigai kyōiku shisetsu (私立在外教育施設), Japanese boarding schools worldwide.
 The parents' desire to acculturate their children;
 Many private and public Japanese schools have become flexible and accept expatriate students via a separate admissions system, or by offering exams in English.

Locations

Nihonjin gakkō tend to be in the following types of areas in the world:

 Those with a large Japanese temporary resident population, such as London or New York City. 
 Those where English is not the official language, such as Düsseldorf, São Paulo, Mexico City, Lima, Dubai, Shanghai and Kuala Lumpur.

As of October 2006:

Map

Asia (except the Middle East)

 Bangladesh
 Japanese School Dhaka
 Cambodia
 Japanese School of Phnom Penh - Sen Sok Section, Established in 2015
 Mainland China
 Beijing Japanese School
 Dalian Japanese School
 Guangzhou Japanese School
 Hangzhou Japanese School (杭州日本人学校)
 Qingdao Japanese School (青島日本人学校)
 Shanghai Japanese School
 Shenzhen Japanese School
 Suzhou Japanese School
 Tianjin Japanese School (天津日本人学校)
 Hong Kong
 Hong Kong Japanese School
 India
 Japanese School of Mumbai
 Japanese School New Delhi
Indonesia
 Bandung Japanese School
 Jakarta Japanese School
 Surabaya Japanese School (スラバヤ日本人学校)
 Malaysia
 The Japanese School of Kuala Lumpur
 The Japanese School of Johor (ジョホール日本人学校)
 Kota Kinabalu Japanese School (コタキナバル日本人学校)
 Penang Japanese School (ペナン日本人学校)
 Myanmar
 Yangon Japanese School
 Pakistan
 Islamabad Japanese School
 Karachi Japanese School
 Philippines
 Manila Japanese School (Taguig)
 Republic of China (Taiwan)
 Kaohsiung Japanese School
 Taichung Japanese School
 Taipei Japanese School
 Singapore
 The Japanese School in Singapore
 Other schools catering to Japanese are Waseda Shibuya Senior High School in Singapore — a Shiritsu zaigai kyoiku shisetsu (私立在外教育施設) or overseas branch of a Japanese private school.
 South Korea
 Busan Japanese School
 Japanese School in Seoul
 Sri Lanka
 Japanese School in Colombo
 Thailand
 Thai-Japanese Association School (Bangkok)
 Thai-Japanese Association School Sriracha (Si Racha)
 Vietnam
 The Japanese School of Hanoi
 The Japanese School in Ho Chi Minh City

Middle East (not including Africa)

 Bahrain
 The Japanese School in Bahrain
 Egypt
 See Africa
 Iran
 Japanese School in Tehran
 Qatar
 The Japan School of Doha
 Saudi Arabia
 Jeddah Japanese School
 Riyadh Japanese School
 Turkey
 Istanbul Japanese School
 United Arab Emirates
 Japanese School in Abu Dhabi
 Japanese School in Dubai

North America

 Mexico
 Escuela Japonesa de Aguascalientes (アグアスカリエンテス日本人学校)  (Aguascalientes City)
 Liceo Mexicano Japonés Seccion Japonesa (Mexico City)
 United States
 The Japanese School of Guam (Mangilao, Guam)
 Chicago Futabakai Japanese School (Arlington Heights, Illinois)
 The New Jersey Japanese School (Oakland, New Jersey)
 The Greenwich Japanese School, the Japanese School of New York (Greenwich, Connecticut)

Central and South America

 Argentina
 Asociación Cultural y Educativa Japonesa (ブエノスアイレス日本人学校, "Japanese School of Buenos Aires")
 Brazil
 Escola Japonesa de Manaus
 Escola Japonesa de São Paulo
 Sociedade Civil de Divulgação Cultural e Educacional Japonesa do Rio de Janeiro
 Chile
 Instituto de Enseñanza Japonesa (サンチャゴ日本人学校) - Lo Barnechea, Santiago Province, Santiago Metropolitan Region
 Colombia
 Asociación Cultural Japonesa (ボゴタ日本人学校; "Japanese School of Bogotá")
 Costa Rica
 Escuela Japonesa de San José - Moravia, San José Province 
 Guatemala
 Escuela Japonesa en Guatemala (グァテマラ日本人学校)
 Panama
 Escuela Japonesa de Panamá
 Paraguay
 Colegio Japones en Asunción (アスンシオン日本人学校)
 Peru
 Asociación "Academia de Cultura Japonesa" (Lima)
 Venezuela
 Colegio Japonés de Caracas (カラカス日本人学校) - Sucre Municipality, Miranda

Europe

 Austria
 Japanische Schule in Wien (Vienna)
 Belgium
 The Japanese School of Brussels
 Czech Republic
 Japanese School in Prague
 France
 Institut Culturel Franco-Japonais (near Paris)
 Germany
 Japanische International Schule Frankfurt am Main e.V.
 Japanische Internationale Schule in Düsseldorf e.V.
 Japanische Internationale Schule Munich e.V.
 Japanische Internationale Schule zu Berlin e.V.
 Japanische Schule in Hamburg e.V.
 Hungary
 The Budapest Japanese School
 Italy
 Scuola Giapponese di Milano - Milan
 Scuola Giapponese di Roma - Rome
 Netherlands
 The Japanese School of Amsterdam
 The Japanese School of Rotterdam
 Poland
 Japanese School in Warsaw
 Romania
 Scoala Japoneza Bucuresti
 Russia
 Japanese School in Moscow
 Spain
 Japanese School of Barcelona
 Colegio Japones de Madrid
 Switzerland
 Japanische Schule in Zürich
 Turkey
 See Middle East
 United Kingdom
Teikyo School United Kingdom
Rikkyo School in England
 The Japanese School in London

Africa

 Egypt
 Cairo Japanese School
 Kenya
 The Nairobi Japanese School
 South Africa
 The Japanese School of Johannesburg

Oceania

 Australia
 The Japanese School in Perth
 The Japanese School of Melbourne
 Sydney Japanese School
 Guam (U.S.)
 See North America

Former locations

Africa:
 Algeria
 École japonaise d'Alger (アルジェ日本人学校) - Algiers - Designated on January 11, 1978 (Showa 53), certified on January 12, 1994 (Heisei 6), revoked March 29, 2002 (Heisei 14)
 Nigeria
 Lagos Japanese School (ラゴス日本人学校) - Designated and certified on March 1, 1975 (Showa 50), revoked March 29, 2002 (Heisei 14)

Asia (excluding Middle East):
 India
 Calcutta Japanese School (カルカタ日本人学校) - Designated on March 30, 1976 (Showa 51), certified on December 18, 1992 (Heisei 4), revoked March 29, 2002 (Heisei 14).
 Indonesia
 Medan Japanese International School or Medan Japanese School (メダン日本人学校)
 It was affiliated with the Japanese Consulate General in Medan, and occupied a  building on a  property. It originated as a supplementary school in the consulate's library that opened in April 1972 (Showa 49). A committee to establish a new day school was created in 1978 (Showa 54), and in January 1979 (Showa 55) the school remodeled an existing building for this purpose. The school opened in April 1979. It closed in March 1998.

Middle East (excluding Africa):
 Iraq
 Baghdad Japanese School (バグダッド日本人学校)
 Kuwait
 Kuwait Japanese School (クウエイト日本人学校)
 Lebanon
 Beirut Japanese School (ベイルート日本人学校) - Designated February 10, 1972 (Showa 47), revoked March 29, 2002 (Heisei 14)
 Turkey
 Ankara Japanese School (アンカラ日本人学校), under the name Japanese Embassy Study Group - Opened April 1, 1979 (Showa 54),

Europe:
 Greece
 Japanese Community School of Athens - Closed March 2007
 Spain
 Colegio Japonés de Las Palmas - Opened in October 1973, closed in March 2001,
 Former Yugoslavia
 Belgrade Japanese School (ベオグラード日本人学校)

South America:
 Brazil
 Escola Japonesa de Belém (ベレーン日本人学校) - Designated on February 25, 1977 (Showa 52), Certified on December 18, 1992 (Heisei 4), revoked March 29, 2002 (Heisei 14).
 Escola Japonesa de Belo Horizonte (ベロ・オリゾンテ日本人学校), a.k.a. Instituto Cultural Mokuyoo-Kai Sociedade Civil - Santa Amélia, Paumplha, Belo Horizonte - Designated on February 6, 1982 (Showa 57), Certified on December 18, 1992 (Heisei 4), revoked March 29, 2002 (Heisei 14).
 Escola Japonesa de Vitória (ヴィトリア日本人学校) - Designated February 10, 1981 (Showa 56), Certified December 18, 1992 (Heisei 4), revoked March 29, 2002 (Heisei 14)
 Ecuador
 Colegio Japonés de Quito (キト日本人学校) - Closed in 2003

Notes

References

Further reading

 Nasuno, Mitsuko (那須野 三津子; Department of Children Studies (子ども学部), Tokyo Seitoku University). "Factors in the Government's Decision to Send Teachers of Children With Disabilities to Overseas Japanese Schools: 1979 to 2002" (海外日本人学校に対する障害児教育担当教員派遣の実現要因:―1979～2002年度の教員派遣制度を通して―; Archive" (海外日本人学校に対する障害児教育担当教員派遣の実現要因:―1979～2002年度の教員派遣制度を通して―; Archive). The Japanese Journal of Special Education   (特殊教育学研究) 49(3), 247-259, 2011. The Japanese Association of Special Education. See profile at CiNii. See profile at J-Stage (CrossRef). English abstract available.
 Ozawa, Michimasa. (小澤 至賢; 国立特別支援教育総合研究所教育 Department of Educational Support (支援部)). "Situation of Support for Japanese Students with Disabilities in Full-day and Supplementary Schools for the Japanese in the Eastern United States" (アメリカ東部地区の日本人学校及び補習授業校における障害のある日本人児童生徒への支援状況 (<特集>米国における障害のある子どもへの教育的支援の実際; Archive" (アメリカ東部地区の日本人学校及び補習授業校における障害のある日本人児童生徒への支援状況 (<特集>米国における障害のある子どもへの教育的支援の実際; Archive). Special Needs Education of the World (世界の特別支援教育) 23, 43–55, 2009–03. National Institute of Special Needs Education (独立行政法人国立特別支援教育総合研究所). See profile at CiNii. English abstract available.
 横尾 俊 (国立特別支援教育総合研究所教育相談部). "平成20年度日本人学校及び補習授業校に対するアンケート結果について" (Archive" (Archive). 国立特別支援教育総合研究所教育相談年報 30, 33-45, 2009-06. National Institute of Special Needs Education (独立行政法人国立特別支援教育総合研究所). See profile at CiNii.
 池﨑 喜美惠. "Actual Conditions of Consumer Education at Japanese Schools in Foreign Countries" (日本人学校における消費者教育の実態). The Bulletin of Japanese Curriculum Research and Development (日本教科教育学会誌). 37(3), 33–40, 2014. 日本教科教育学会. See profile at CiNii.

 
Lists of international schools

Economy of Japan

Japan education-related lists